Win Radio is a network of radio stations of ZimZam Management, Inc., led by radio veteran and executive Manuelito "Manny" Luzon. Compared to major rivals (My Only Radio, Love Radio, Barangay FM, etc.) which are run by their associated parent company, ZimZam buys Win Radio's airtime from third-party networks, as they do not have a legal franchise to directly operate stations.

Win Radio currently operates five radio stations owned by Mabuhay Broadcasting System and another one owned by Sarraga Integrated and Management Corporation.

History

Win Radio was born after PBC's NU 107, a popular radio station that plays mainly rock music and  Original Pilipino Music since 1987, suffered from financial difficulties and poor ratings in its latter years. Eventually, the PBC decided to reformat the station and inject new capital. On October 10, 2010, radio veteran Manuelito "Manny" Luzon was appointed EVP and COO of PBC and subsequently shutdown NU 107 on November 8, 2010. The following day, November 8, DWNU is rebranded as 107.5 Win Radio. PBC's provincial radio counterparts followed suit between January and March 2011.

Luzon originally coined the name "Love Radio" for DZMB in the 80s. From 2002 to 2017, it retained its #1 spot among Metro Manila stations. He also formed radio network Ultrasonic Broadcasting System in 1991, and created and popularized Energy FM in key provinces beginning in 1996. In 2003, Energy took over DWKY in Manila, immediately becoming a household sensation and in 2008 reaching as far as #2 among Metro Manila stations.

Reformatted as a "more decent mainstream frequency", it distinguishes itself from its competitors through "responsible programming" without playing songs "with double meaning" as is the structure for the masa market. Just four months after its debut, Win Radio Manila landed at #7 according to the March 2011 KBP Radio Research Council survey.

To expand its coverage, DWKY reformatted as 91.5 Big Radio on June 1, 2011, serving as affiliate of Win Radio after the Henares family, acquired a 25% minority share of its owner Mabuhay Broadcasting System. Win Radio and Big Radio occupied the former NU 107 facilities at the AIC Gold Tower in Ortigas Center, Pasig; and ties together in promotion, including singing competition "The Win-Big Singing Talent Search". The said development made Luzon's brands a de facto duopoly to rivals in the Metro Manila market. At its peak, Big Radio ranked #3 in the FM radio ratings according to the March 2012 KBP Radio Research Council survey. ZimZam Management, which owns both brands, began modernization of facilities through the leasing of broadcast space at the Summit One Tower in Mandaluyong, which will about to house studios of both Win Radio and Big Radio.

However, plans fell through on June 28, 2014, when Breakthrough and Milestones Productions International, which operates PBC-owned UNTV, decided to operate the 107.5 frequency and relaunch the station as Wish 1075. Luzon then severed ties with PBC, shut down Big Radio, and transferred Win Radio to 91.5 FM through its new facilities in Pasig.

Stations

Current

Former

References

Radio stations in the Philippines
Philippine radio networks